Ursa Township is one of twenty-two townships in Adams County, Illinois, United States. As of the 2010 census, its population was 1,073 and it contained 507 housing units.

Geography

Cities
 Ursa

Unincorporated towns
 Marcelline
 Rock Creek

Cemeteries
The township contains six cemeteries: Booth, Denson, Keith, New Providence, Stone Family and Wesley Chapel.

Major highways
  Illinois State Route 61
  Illinois State Route 96

Airports and landing strips
 Schnelle Airport

Lakes
 Indian Grave Lake

Demographics
As of the 2020 census there were 1,102 people, 362 households, and 237 families residing in the township. The racial makeup of the township was 93.28% White, 0.09% African American, 0.27% Native American, 0.27% Asian, 0.00% Pacific Islander, 1.36% from other races, and 4.72% from two or more races. Hispanic or Latino of any race were 0.91% of the population.

There were 362 households, out of which 19.60% had children under the age of 18 living with them, 59.94% were married couples living together, 5.52% had a female householder with no spouse present, and 34.53% were non-families. 29.30% of all households were made up of individuals, and 11.30% had someone living alone who was 65 years of age or older. The average household size was 2.15 and the average family size was 2.64.

The township's age distribution consisted of 18.8% under the age of 18, 4.6% from 18 to 24, 23.4% from 25 to 44, 32.7% from 45 to 64, and 20.6% who were 65 years of age or older. The median age was 48.1 years. For every 100 females, there were 109.1 males. For every 100 females age 18 and over, there were 103.9 males.

The median income for a household in the township was $55,357, and the median income for a family was $71,094. Males had a median income of $56,250 versus $26,208 for females. The per capita income for the township was $37,278. About 5.5% of families and 5.7% of the population were below the poverty line, including 2.8% of those under age 18 and 8.8% of those age 65 or over.

School districts
 Community Unit School District 4

Political districts
 Illinois' 17th congressional district
 State House District 93
 State Senate District 47

References
 
 United States Census Bureau 2007 TIGER/Line Shapefiles
 United States National Atlas

External links
 List of Adams County township trustees
 City-Data.com
 Illinois State Archives

Townships in Adams County, Illinois
1849 establishments in Illinois
Townships in Illinois